Mičovice is a municipality and village in Prachatice District in the South Bohemian Region of the Czech Republic. It has about 400 inhabitants.

Administrative parts
Villages of Frantoly, Jáma, Klenovice and Ratiborova Lhota are administrative parts of Mičovice.

References

Villages in Prachatice District